Dastgerd (also Romanized as Dastjerd; also known as Dastgerd-e Bālā) is a village in Mud Rural District, Mud District, Sarbisheh County, South Khorasan Province, Iran. At the 2006 census, its population was 110, in 40 families.

References 

Populated places in Sarbisheh County